RHR may stand for

 Rabbis for Human Rights
 Radical History Review, a journal
 Right-hand rule
 Rohr, Inc., former NYSE ticker symbol
 Rolling hairpin replication
 Resting heart rate